Methodist Episcopal Church of Windham Centre, also known as Windham-Hensonville United Methodist Church, is a historic  Methodist Episcopal church on New York State Route 23 in Windham, Greene County, New York.  The property includes the church, parsonage, and garage.  The church was built in 1844 and is a one-story wood-frame structure in the Greek Revival style.  It features a square two stage tower.  The parsonage was built in 1902.

It was added to the National Register of Historic Places in 2009.

References

Methodist churches in New York (state)
Churches on the National Register of Historic Places in New York (state)
Neoclassical architecture in New York (state)
Churches completed in 1844
19th-century Methodist church buildings in the United States
Churches in Greene County, New York
National Register of Historic Places in Greene County, New York
Neoclassical church buildings in the United States